Sisudatu, also known by her nickname Sisu, is a fictional character who appears in Walt Disney Animation Studios' 59th animated feature Raya and the Last Dragon (2021). Created by screenwriter Adele Lim, she is voiced by American actress and rapper Awkwafina.

Inspired by the Nāga from Hinduism, Buddhism and Jainism, she is depicted as the last dragon in the land of Kumandra. To get rid of the Druun, monsters who once threatened Kumandra, Sisu compressed her magic into a gem. Humanity later fought over the gem and broke it, leading to Princess of Heart Raya seeking her help to banish the Druun again. Sisu and Raya travel across Kumandra to find the gem pieces, making new friends along the way, and learning the importance of trust.

Sisu has received generally positive reviews from critics, who praised her design, sense of forgiveness, self-deprecating comedy, and contribution to the message.

Development

Origins and conception

Voice 
Awkwafina voices Sisu. During the COVID-19 pandemic, Disney sent her an audio production tent for her home recording acoustics. Shurer explained: "When we met Awkwafina, we knew, first of all, that she's an incredible actress with a wide range, and with a very professional and disciplined approach to acting. But Awkwafina fit the dragon that we were looking for— some combination of wisdom and emotion and humor. She brings all those three things together in some magical potion." Director Carlos López Estrada called her something "amazing" in the film due to her ability to perform both comedy and drama. Director Don Hall stated he could not imagine somebody other than Awkwafina as Sisu. Estrada said she improvised many of the scenes and "brought [Sisu] to life in a way that was very exciting to watch."

Design and personality 
Story artist Luis Logam stated the directors want Sisu to "completely throw Raya off guard and out of her comfort zone" during their first meeting. Logam was encouraged to add a lot of physicality to Sisu's movement. The directors described Sisu as "funny [and] self-deprecating".

Outward appearance 
Unlike most dragons from Disney films, Sisu does not have wings and a bulky body. She was inspired by the Southeast Asian dragons known as the Nāga which were tied to the element of water. Similar to depictions of dragons in China, Sisu's body is snake-like and slender. Her form is made up of multiple elements of other animals. Her head is similar to the mane of a lion while her body has dorsal fins and is covered in fish-like scales. Her teeth, feet and claws are similar to that of a tiger which is a trait from Chinese mythology. However, unlike typical Chinese dragons, she lacks long barbels.  In the film, Sisu possesses bioluminescence. The directors wanted Sisu to look "breathtakingly beautiful". Her hair was "meant to make her feel light and ethereal, through its almost magically weightless motion, which accentuates her being divine and mystical." Steve Arounsack, a visual anthropologist and consultant on the film, was collaborated with on Sisu's design. Awkwafina stated she saw parts of her teeth and eyes in Sisu.

Appearances

Raya and the Last Dragon

Merchandise 
Following the release of Raya and the Last Dragon, Disney released Sisu dolls in both human and dragon form. In a Kumandra figure play set, Sisu was featured. A Sisu plushy was also released.

Reception 
Vulture called Sisu the "angel on [Raya's] shoulder urging her toward forgiveness". Common Sense Media praised her power, courage sweetness, forgiveness, trust and empathy. Rolling Stone writer David Fear lauded Sisu's sassiness, furriness, snarkiness and funniness. Ben Travis of Empire complimented the effects of her mane. RogerEbert.com Brian Tallerico commended the "gorgeous" design of Sisu. Writing for NPR, Justin Chang said Sisu was "all feel-good vibes". Vox described her as being a "fun" magical sidekick: "she's wisecracking but earnest, rambunctious but wise, and her loving nature is a good foil for Raya". Firstpost stated she had a "mix of self-deprecating comedy, occasional wisdom and a get-out-of-jail-free card."

References 

Walt Disney Animation Studios characters
Fictional dragons
Film characters introduced in 2021
Fictional characters with water abilities
Fictional shapeshifters
Fictional characters with air or wind abilities
Female characters in animated films
Fictional sole survivors